DNA polymerase delta subunit 2 is an enzyme that in humans is encoded by the POLD2 gene. It is a component of the  DNA polymerase delta complex.

Interactions
POLD2 has been shown to interact with PCNA.

References

Further reading

External links